The 2022 Four Days of Dunkirk (French: Quatre Jours de Dunkerque 2022) was the 66th edition of the Four Days of Dunkirk cycling stage race. It started on 3 May in Dunkirk and ended on 8 May again in Dunkirk.

Teams
Six of the eighteen UCI WorldTeams, eight UCI ProTeams, and four UCI Continental team made up the eighteen teams that participated in the race.

UCI WorldTeams

 
 
 
 
 
 

UCI ProTeams

 
 
 
 
 
 
 
 

UCI Continental Teams

Route

Stages

Stage 1
3 May 2022 — Dunkirk to Aniche,

Stage 2
4 May 2022 — Béthune to Maubege,

Stage 3
5 May 2022 — Péronne to Mont-Saint-Éloi,

Stage 4
6 May 2022 — Mazingarbe to Aire-sur-la-Lys,

Stage 5
7 May 2022 — Roubaix to Cassel,

Stage 6
8 May 2022 — Ardres to Dunkirk,

Classification leadership table

Classification standings

General classification

Points classification

Mountains classification

Young rider classification

Team classification

References

External links 
Official site

Four Days of Dunkirk
Four Days of Dunkirk
Four Days of Dunkirk
Four Days of Dunkirk